The American Tobacco Historic District is a historic tobacco factory complex and national historic district located in Durham, Durham County, North Carolina. The district encompasses 14 contributing buildings and three contributing structures built by the American Tobacco Company and its predecessors and successors from 1874 to the 1950s.  Located in the district is the separately listed Italianate style W. T. Blackwell and Company building (1874-1880, c. 1904).  Other notable contributing resources are the Romanesque Revival style Hill Warehouse (1900), Washington Warehouse (1902–07), the Lucky Strike Building (1901–02), and Reed Warehouse; Noell Building (c. 1930); Power Plant and Engine House (1929–39); and the Art Moderne style Fowler (1939) Strickland (1946) and Crowe (1953) buildings.

It was listed on the National Register of Historic Places in 2000 as the American Tobacco Company Manufacturing Plant.

Redevelopment

Nearby, but not part of the multi-use redevelopment district, is the Durham Bulls Athletic Park, the studios of Fox 50, and the Durham Performing Arts Center. The Historic District is part of a large urban renewal project in downtown Durham designed to bring residents, businesses, and shoppers to the formerly blighted downtown area. The campus had been the headquarters of the American Tobacco Company, once the largest manufacturer of cigarettes in the United States. The mostly abandoned campus was purchased by the Capitol Broadcasting Company in 2001 as part of a plan to redevelop downtown Durham. Other companies have completed similar plans, Measurement Incorporated purchased and renovated the Brodie Duke Warehouse, the Imperial Tobacco Warehouse, and BC Remedy Building.

References

External links
 American Tobacco Historic District official website

H
Tobacco buildings in the United States
Tourist attractions in Durham, North Carolina
Historic American Engineering Record in North Carolina
Industrial buildings and structures on the National Register of Historic Places in North Carolina
Historic districts on the National Register of Historic Places in North Carolina
Italianate architecture in North Carolina
Moderne architecture in North Carolina
Romanesque Revival architecture in North Carolina
Industrial buildings completed in 1874
Historic districts in Durham, North Carolina
National Register of Historic Places in Durham County, North Carolina
1874 establishments in North Carolina